Fruits of Passion is a 1919 American silent drama film directed by George Ridgwell and starring Alice Mann and Donald Hall. Location shooting took place in the Adirondack Mountains.

Cast
 Alice Mann		
 Frankie Mann
 Emil De Varney	
 Colin Campbell	
 Philip Yale Drew		
 Donald Hall	
 John Lowell
 Harry Fisher 
 Charles A. Robins

References

Bibliography
 Goble, Alan. The Complete Index to Literary Sources in Film. Walter de Gruyter, 1999.

External links
 

1919 films
1919 drama films
1910s English-language films
American silent feature films
Silent American drama films
American black-and-white films
Films directed by George Ridgwell
Triangle Film Corporation films
1910s American films